Absolutism may refer to:

Government
 Absolute monarchy, in which a monarch rules free of laws or legally organized opposition
 Absolutism (European history), period c. 1610 – c. 1789 in Europe
 Enlightened absolutism, influenced by the Enlightenment (18th- and early 19th-century Europe)
 Autocracy, a political theory which argues that one person should hold all power
 Tsarist autocracy, is a form of autocracy (later absolute monarchy) specific to Russia

Philosophy

General philosophy
 Absolutism, the view that facts are absolute rather than merely relative (sometimes called "universality")

Ethics
 Moral absolutism, the belief in absolute standards against which moral questions can be judged, regardless of context
 Graded absolutism, the view that a moral absolute, such as "Do not kill", can be greater or lesser than another moral absolute, such as "Do not lie"

Hegelian philosophy
 Absolute (philosophy), the Hegelian concept of an objective and unconditioned reality, said to underlie perceived objects
 Absolute idealism, an ontologically monistic philosophy attributed to G. W. F. Hegel

Physics
 Absolute theory, in physics
 Absolute space, a theory that space exists absolutely; contrast with relationalism

Psychology
 Splitting (psychology), also called black-and-white thinking or all-or-nothing thinking